Alieu Touray-Saidy (born September 8, 1976) is a soccer player.

Career
Touray-Saidy played with the Northern Virginia Royals in the USL Pro Soccer League in 2003, scoring one goals in 10 appearances for the club.

References

1976 births
Living people
USL Second Division players
Northern Virginia Royals players
Association football midfielders
American soccer players
Association football forwards